In geometry, a heptadecagon, septadecagon or 17-gon is a seventeen-sided polygon.

Regular heptadecagon
A regular heptadecagon is represented by the Schläfli symbol {17}.

Construction 

As 17 is a Fermat prime, the regular heptadecagon is a constructible polygon (that is, one that can be constructed using a compass and unmarked straightedge): this was shown by Carl Friedrich Gauss in 1796 at the age of 19. This proof represented the first progress in regular polygon construction in over 2000 years. Gauss's book Disquisitiones Arithmeticae gives this (in modern notation) as

Constructions for the regular triangle, pentagon, pentadecagon, and polygons with 2h times as many sides had been given by Euclid, but constructions based on the Fermat primes other than 3 and 5 were unknown to the ancients. (The only known Fermat primes are Fn for n = 0, 1, 2, 3, 4. They are 3, 5, 17, 257, and 65537.)

The explicit construction of a heptadecagon was given by Herbert William Richmond in 1893. The following method of construction uses Carlyle circles, as shown below. Based on the construction of the regular 17-gon, one can readily construct n-gons with n being the product of 17 with 3 or 5 (or both) and any power of 2: a regular 51-gon, 85-gon or 255-gon and any regular n-gon with 2h times as many sides.

Another construction of the regular heptadecagon using straightedge and compass is the following:

T. P. Stowell of Rochester, N. Y., responded to Query, by W.E. Heal, Wheeling, Indiana in The Analyst in the year 1874:

"To construct a regular polygon of seventeen sides in a circle.
Draw the radius CO at right-angles to the diameter AB: On OC and OB, take OQ  equal to the half, and OD equal to the eighth part of the radius: Make DE and DF each equal to DQ and EG and FH respectively equal to EQ and FQ; take OK a mean proportional  between OH and OQ, and through K, draw KM parallel to AB, meeting the semicircle described on OG in M; draw MN parallel to OC, cutting the given circle in N – the arc AN is the seventeenth part of the whole circumference."

The following simple design comes from Herbert William Richmond from the year 1893:
 
"LET OA, OB (fig. 6) be two perpendicular radii of a circle. Make OI one-fourth of OB, and the angle OIE one-fourth of OIA; also find in OA produced a point F such that EIF is 45°. Let the circle on AF as diameter cut OB in K, and let the circle whose centre is E and radius EK cut OA in N3 and N5; then if ordinates N3P3, N5P5 are drawn to the circle, the arcs AP3, AP5 will be 3/17 and 5/17 of the circumference."

The point N3 is very close to the center point of Thales' theorem over AF.

The following construction is a variation of H. W. Richmond's construction.

The differences to the original:
The circle k2 determines the point H instead of the bisector w3.
The circle k4 around the point G' (reflection of the point G at m) yields the point N, which is no longer so close to M, for the construction of the tangent.
Some names have been changed.

Another more recent construction is given by Callagy.

Exact value of sin and cos of 

If ,  and  then, depending on any integer m

For example, if m = 1

Here are the expressions simplified into the following table.

Therefore, applying induction with m=1 and starting with n=0:

 and

Symmetry

The regular heptadecagon has Dih17 symmetry, order 34. Since 17 is a prime number there is one subgroup with dihedral symmetry: Dih1, and 2 cyclic group symmetries: Z17, and Z1.

These 4 symmetries can be seen in 4 distinct symmetries on the heptadecagon. John Conway labels these by a letter and group order. Full symmetry of the regular form is r34 and no symmetry is labeled a1. The dihedral symmetries are divided depending on whether they pass through vertices (d for diagonal) or edges (p for perpendiculars), and i when reflection lines path through both edges and vertices. Cyclic symmetries in the middle column are labeled as g for their central gyration orders.

Each subgroup symmetry allows one or more degrees of freedom for irregular forms. Only the g17 subgroup has no degrees of freedom but can seen as directed edges.

Related polygons

Heptadecagrams
A heptadecagram is a 17-sided star polygon. There are seven regular forms given by Schläfli symbols: {17/2}, {17/3}, {17/4}, {17/5}, {17/6}, {17/7}, and {17/8}. Since 17 is a prime number, all of these are regular stars and not compound figures.

Petrie polygons
The regular heptadecagon is the Petrie polygon for one higher-dimensional regular convex polytope, projected in a skew orthogonal projection:

References

Further reading

Klein, Felix et al. Famous Problems and Other Monographs. – Describes the algebraic aspect, by Gauss.

External links

 Contains a description of the construction.
 
Heptadecagon trigonometric functions
BBC video of New R&D center for SolarUK
Archived at Ghostarchive and the Wayback Machine: 

Constructible polygons
Polygons by the number of sides
Euclidean plane geometry